12052 Aretaon  is a mid-sized Jupiter trojan from the Trojan camp, approximately  in diameter. It was discovered on 3 May 1997, by Belgian astronomer Eric Elst at ESO's La Silla Observatory in northern Chile. The dark Jovian asteroid has a rotation period of 8.05 hours. It was named after Aretaon from Greek mythology.

Orbit and classification 

Aretaon is a Jupiter trojan in a 1:1 orbital resonance with Jupiter. It is located in the trailering Trojan camp at the Gas Giant's  Lagrangian point, 60° behind its orbit . It orbits the Sun at a distance of 4.9–5.6 AU once every 11 years and 12 months (4,381 days; semi-major axis of 5.24 AU). Its orbit has an eccentricity of 0.07 and an inclination of 11° with respect to the ecliptic.

Naming 

This minor planet was named from Greek mythology after the Trojan warrior Aretaon. He was killed by Teucer during the Trojan War. The official naming citation was published by the Minor Planet Center on 6 January 2003.

Physical characteristics 

Aretaon is an assumed, carbonaceous C-type asteroid. The majority of Jupiter trojans are D-types, with the reminder being mostly C- and P-type asteroids.

Rotation period 

In September 2012, a rotational lightcurve of Aretaon was obtained from photometric observations by Robert Stephens at the Center for Solar System Studies in Landers, California. Lightcurve analysis gave a rotation period of 8.05 hours with a brightness amplitude of 0.17 magnitude. This period determination was confirmed by astronomers at the Palomar Transient Factory in September 2013, measuring a period of 8.048 hours and an amplitude of 0.19 magnitude in the R-band.

Diameter and albedo 

According to the survey carried out by the NEOWISE mission of NASA's Wide-field Infrared Survey Explorer, Aretaon measures 39.151 kilometers in diameter and its surface has an albedo of 0.073, while the Collaborative Asteroid Lightcurve Link assumes a standard albedo for a carbonaceous asteroid of 0.057 and calculates a diameter of 42.23 kilometers based on an absolute magnitude of 10.6.

References

External links 
 Asteroid Lightcurve Database (LCDB), query form (info )
 Dictionary of Minor Planet Names, Google books
 Discovery Circumstances: Numbered Minor Planets (10001)-(15000) – Minor Planet Center
 Asteroid 12052 Aretaon at the Small Bodies Data Ferret
 
 

012052
Discoveries by Eric Walter Elst
Named minor planets
19970503